Mangelia vitrea is a species of sea snail, a marine gastropod mollusk in the family Mangeliidae.

References

vitrea
Gastropods described in 1940